Thermorthemis is a genus of dragonflies in the family Libellulidae.

Species

References

External links

Libellulidae
Anisoptera genera
Odonata of Africa